The meridian 116° west of Greenwich is a line of longitude that extends from the North Pole across the Arctic Ocean, North America, the Pacific Ocean, the Southern Ocean, and Antarctica to the South Pole.

The 116th meridian west forms a great circle with the 64th meridian east.

From Pole to Pole
Starting at the North Pole and heading south to the South Pole, the 116th meridian west passes through:

{| class="wikitable plainrowheaders"
! scope="col" width="130" | Co-ordinates
! scope="col" | Country, territory or sea
! scope="col" | Notes
|-
| style="background:#b0e0e6;" | 
! scope="row" style="background:#b0e0e6;" | Arctic Ocean
| style="background:#b0e0e6;" |
|-
| 
! scope="row" | 
| Northwest Territories — Prince Patrick Island
|-
| style="background:#b0e0e6;" | 
! scope="row" style="background:#b0e0e6;" | Fitzwilliam Strait
| style="background:#b0e0e6;" |
|-
| 
! scope="row" | 
| Northwest Territories — Melville Island
|-
| style="background:#b0e0e6;" | 
! scope="row" style="background:#b0e0e6;" | M'Clure Strait
| style="background:#b0e0e6;" |
|-
| 
! scope="row" | 
| Northwest Territories — Banks Island
|-
| style="background:#b0e0e6;" | 
! scope="row" style="background:#b0e0e6;" | Prince of Wales Strait
| style="background:#b0e0e6;" |
|-
| 
! scope="row" | 
| Northwest Territories — Victoria Island
|-
| style="background:#b0e0e6;" | 
! scope="row" style="background:#b0e0e6;" | Prince Albert Sound
| style="background:#b0e0e6;" |
|-valign="top"
| 
! scope="row" | 
|-
| style="background:#b0e0e6;" | 
! scope="row" style="background:#b0e0e6;" | Dolphin and Union Strait
| style="background:#b0e0e6;" |
|-valign="top"
| 
! scope="row" | 
|-valign="top"
| 
! scope="row" | 
| Montana Idaho — from  Nevada — from  California — from 
|-
| 
! scope="row" | 
| Baja California
|-
| style="background:#b0e0e6;" | 
! scope="row" style="background:#b0e0e6;" | Pacific Ocean
| style="background:#b0e0e6;" |
|-
| style="background:#b0e0e6;" | 
! scope="row" style="background:#b0e0e6;" | Southern Ocean
| style="background:#b0e0e6;" |
|-
| 
! scope="row" | Antarctica
| Unclaimed territory
|-
|}

See also
115th meridian west
117th meridian west

w116 meridian west